Rowdy was the third and final album by Steve Forde & The Flange. The band split, but Forde went on to record two more albums and is still active.

Track listing
"No Wrong"
"Feels Alright"
"Aussie Philosophy"
"The Ride"
"Goin' & Blowin'"
"Crazy Love"
"Captain Goodtime"
"All I Need"
"Everybody Else"
"Bare Backin'"
"QLD Song"
"Cowboy Style" (featuring Vanilla Ice)

Singles
"No Wrong"
"Aussie Philosophy"

References

Steve Forde albums